James or Jim Molyneux or Molyneaux may refer to:
 Jim Molyneux, English footballer
 James Molyneaux, Baron Molyneaux of Killead (1920–2015), MP and Ulster Unionist Party leader
 James Molyneux Caulfeild (1820–1892), Irish MP and later 3rd Earl of Charlemont
 James More Molyneux (died 1776), British politician